Basil was the first Patriarch of the Bulgarian Orthodox Church after restoring Tarnovo Patriarchate. Basil of Bulgaria crowned younger brother Asen I and consecrated the church "St. Demetrius" in Tarnovo.

References 

Patriarchs of Bulgaria